State Route 313 (SR 313, OH 313) is a  long east–west state highway located in the southeastern portion of the U.S. state of Ohio.

Route description
Along its path, SR 313 travels through eastern Muskingum County, southern Guernsey County and northeastern Noble County. No segment of SR 313 is included as a portion of the National Highway System.

History
The SR 313 designation was applied in 1932.  When it was established, SR 313 existed only along the current alignment of the highway between its eastern junction with SR 83, at the time known as SR 76, southeast of New Concord and its intersection with SR 821, then a portion of US 21, north of Pleasant City.

In 1935, SR 313 was extended east to a new terminus at SR 285 in Senecaville.  Two years later, the highway was extended on the west end to its current western terminus at SR 146.  SR 313 would be extended on the east end again in 1947.  This extension followed the present alignment of the route along the north side of Senecaville Lake to a new eastern terminus at what is now the intersection that marks the southern terminus of SR 761.  Then, it was designated as SR 670, which utilized the current easternmost stretch of SR 313 and the entirety of SR 761.  It would be until 1974 before SR 313 took on the shape it has today when the SR 670 designation was removed from the state highway system due to the construction of Interstate 670 (I-670) in Columbus.  Consequently, SR 313 was extended to its present eastern terminus at SR 147 over the previous southern stretch of SR 670, while the remainder of the former SR 670 north of SR 313 became SR 761.

Major intersections

References

313
313
313
313